Charles Henry Coolidge Jr. (born 1946) is a retired lieutenant general in the United States Air Force who served as vice commander of Air Force Materiel Command from 2000 to 2004. He graduated from the United States Air Force Academy in 1968. He is the son of Charles H. Coolidge, a Medal of Honor recipient.

References

1946 births
Living people
Recipients of the Air Force Distinguished Service Medal
Recipients of the Defense Distinguished Service Medal
Recipients of the Distinguished Flying Cross (United States)
Recipients of the Legion of Merit
United States Air Force Academy alumni
United States Air Force generals
United States Air Force personnel of the Vietnam War